Willi Berger is an Austrian para-alpine skier. He represented Austria in alpine skiing at the 1976 Winter Paralympics.

His win at the Alpine Combination IV B event formed part of a medal sweep as Horst Morokutti and Adolf Hagn, both representing Austria as well, won the gold and silver medals respectively.

Achievements

See also 
 List of Paralympic medalists in alpine skiing

References 

Living people
Year of birth missing (living people)
Place of birth missing (living people)
Paralympic alpine skiers of Austria
Alpine skiers at the 1976 Winter Paralympics
Medalists at the 1976 Winter Paralympics
Paralympic bronze medalists for Austria
Paralympic medalists in alpine skiing